is a role-playing video game series produced by Telenet Japan. The series has a motif of Celtic mythology and consists of three games: Tenshi no Uta (1991), Tenshi no Uta II: Datenshi no Sentaku (1993), and Tenshi no Uta: Shiroki Tsubasa no Inori (1994).

Games

Tenshi no Uta 
 was released on 25 October 1991 as one of the launch titles for the PC-Engine Super CD-ROM².

Tenshi no Uta II: Datenshi no Sentaku 
 was released on 26 March 1993, also for the Super CD-ROM².  The game setting in a 100-year-after parallel universe of its predecessor. Characters were designed by Nobuteru Yūki.

Tenshi No Uta: Shiroki Tsubasa no Inori 

 was published for the Super Famicom on July 29, 1994. It is the third episode in the series, but is not a true sequel to the first and second episodes previously released on the PC Engine.

Members of Wolfteam were involved with this project. It is the first time that Wolfteam members worked with many workers getting transferred from the Riot subsidiary. Music and sound design were provided by Motoi Sakuraba, Shinji Tamura, and Hiroya Hatsushiba. An English fan translation was released in 2018.

References 

Fantasy video games
Fantasy video games set in the Middle Ages
Japan-exclusive video games
Video games based on Celtic mythology
Video games developed in Japan
Video games scored by Motoi Sakuraba
Video game franchises introduced in 1991